Mount Alvernia College is an independent Roman Catholic secondary school for girls located in the Brisbane suburb of Kedron, in the state of Queensland, Australia. It was founded in 1956 by the Missionary Franciscan Sisters of the Immaculate Conception.

Mount Alvernia is a member of the Catholic Secondary Schoolgirls' Sports Association.

Overview 
Mount Alvernia's mission statement is "Educating young women in the Franciscan tradition". Academic, cultural, spiritual, and outreach programs are based upon the Franciscan values of love, compassion, simplicity, peace, joy, trust in God, respect, and service.

The College has seven buildings housing state-of-the-art science, sporting, arts, technology, and home economics facilities. The school grounds also feature a garden, La Foresta, that is both decorative and functional, providing fresh produce for use in the canteen and home economics classes.

Prior to 2015, the College separated students into four house groups: Greccio, Perugia, Rieti, and Spoleto. When the first cohort of Year 7 students entered the College in 2015, two new houses were introduced: Villa Spada and Belle Prairie. Each house is named after a significant location in the lives of St Francis of Assisi and founder of the Missionary Franciscan Sisters of the Immaculate Conception Elizabeth Hayes.

Mount Alvernia is adjacent to two other Franciscan schools: primary school St Anthony's and Padua College, a Year 5 - 12 school for boys. The three schools are known collectively as Franciscans on the Hill (FOTH).

The College is operated by Mercy Partners and is a member of the Franciscan Schools Australia network.

References

External links

Commonwealth Register of Institutions and Courses for Overseas Students: Institution Details, Mount Alvernia College, CRICOS Provider Code: 03301G

Catholic secondary schools in Brisbane
Private secondary schools in Brisbane
1956 establishments in Australia
Kedron, Queensland
Educational institutions established in 1956
Girls' schools in Queensland
Alliance of Girls' Schools Australasia
Franciscan